Who Me was a top secret, sulfurous, non-lethal chemical weapon developed by the American Office of Strategic Services during World War II, to be used by the French Resistance against German officers. Who Me smelled strongly of fecal matter, and was issued in pocket atomizers intended to be unobtrusively sprayed on a German officer, humiliating him and, by extension, demoralizing the occupying German forces.

The experiment was very short-lived, however. Who Me had a high concentration of extremely volatile sulfur compounds that were very difficult to control: more often than not, the person who did the spraying also ended up smelling as bad as the one targeted. After only two weeks, it was concluded that Who Me was a failure.

References

External links
 Pain, Stephanie (July 7, 2001).  "Stench Warfare".  New Scientist

Non-lethal weapons
Military equipment of World War II
Odor